The Austro–Serbian Convention of 1881 was a secret bilateral treaty signed in Belgrade on 28 June 1881 by Gabriel Freiherr Herbert-Rathkeal on behalf of the Austro-Hungarian Empire and by Čedomilj Mijatović on behalf of the Principality of Serbia. The convention effectively turned Serbia into a protectorate state of Austria-Hungary, which meant its accession by proxy to the subsequent Triple Alliance (1882). Serbia received Austrian support during the Serbo-Bulgarian War.
 
The Balkans had been divided into spheres of influence, where Austria took the western part (including Serbia) and Russia took the eastern part (including Bulgaria). The treaty came after the railway convention of 6 April 1881 for the construction of the Belgrade–Niš section of the Vienna–Constantinople railway, and the trade treaty of 6 May 1881 which made Austria-Hungary virtually the sole market for agricultural products from Serbia and thereby dominant.

Following the Treaty of Berlin (1878), Serbia chose to accept Austria as its patron, when Russia had become a protector of Bulgaria. Nevertheless, the conclusion of the convention was met with resentment and opposition from Russophile sections of the political class in Serbia, including opposition on the part of the then-prime minister Milan Piroćanac. 

Under the treaty, Austria-Hungary pledged to support the Obrenović dynasty and recognise the Serbian prince as king, and acknowledged Serbia′s southward territorial claims; in return, Serbia undertook not to allow any agitation or military activity inimical to Austro-Hungarian interests, which notably included those in Bosnia and Herzegovina and Sanjak of Novi Pazar; all foreign treaties of Serbia were to obtain Vienna′s prior approval.

See also
Ottoman–Bulgarian alliance
Pig War (1906–08)

References

Sources

 

1881 treaties
Treaties of Austria-Hungary
Treaties of the Principality of Serbia
Military alliances involving Austria
Military alliances involving Serbia
19th century in Austria-Hungary
19th century in Serbia
Austria-Hungary–Serbia relations
Economy of the Kingdom of Serbia